Glam Slam Ulysses was a 1993 musical production by Prince, loosely based on Homer's Odyssey, featuring a combination of live performances and video, with thirteen previously unreleased songs.

Each song represented an element from Homer's Odyssey (Ulysses is the Latin name for the protagonist, Odysseus). The musical received a limited performance at Prince's Glam Slam nightclub, with a few shows being performed in late August to early September 1993. Carmen Electra, who was relatively unknown at the time, was a featured dancer in the performance, as was Frank Williams.  Jamie King provided the choreography. Genny Schorr Costumer 

When Prince first announced to change his name to an unpronounceable symbol on June 7, 1993, he also stated that he would no longer be releasing new albums; instead he was to focus on alternative performances, films, etc., while his record company, Warner Bros. Records, would be able to release albums from Prince's vault of unreleased material to fulfill his contract.  The first of these alternative performances would be Glam Slam Ulysses.

Songs
As listed on a flier for the production, the story elements were represented by the following songs:

Legacy 
Most of the songs would eventually be released in some form over time. "Pope" was released as part of 1993's The Hits/The B-Sides compilation.  The bulk of the remaining material would be considered for the Come album, albeit not all of the planned songs made the final release. Come would end up including the following tracks: "Pheromone", "Dark", "Loose", "Space", "Race" and "Come", though "Dark", "Loose", and "Race" were heavily remixed and "Come" was re-recorded as an entirely new number.  Although not listed on the Glam Slam Ulysses track listing, "Orgasm", originally part of "What's My Name" was also included on Come.

"Dolphin" and "Endorphinmachine" would end up being released on The Gold Experience in 1995 — both songs would be slightly remixed.  "Interactive" was considered at one point, but did not make the final release.

"Interactive", "What's My Name" and "Strays of the World" would eventually be released on Prince's Crystal Ball in 1998, with little changes to the original versions.  Also on Crystal Ball were remixes of "Dark" and "Loose" (called "So Dark" and "Get Loose"), as well as a track called "18 & Over", which is essentially a remix of the album version of "Come", but with new lyrics.

References

Works by Prince (musician)
1993 musicals
Musicals based on poems
Works based on the Odyssey